Dan Jennings may refer to:

 Dan Jennings (manager), baseball executive and manager  
 Dan Jennings (pitcher), professional baseball player